is a Japanese mixed martial artist, currently competing in the atomweight division of Rizin Fighting Federation. She is the current Jewels Strawweight and Rizin Super Atomweight champion.

As of January 3, 2022, Izawa is ranked as the best atomweight in the world by both Fight Matrix and Sherdog.

Personal life and background 
Izawa began practicing judo at the age of four, and took up wrestling in the 4th grade of elementary school. Representing the Sakushin Gakuin High School, Izawa placed third in the 2012 Japanese National Junior High School Wrestling Tournament and fifth in the National High School Judo Championship. Izawa won the second place in the All Japan Women's Sumo Championship ultra-lightweight weight class.

On June 30, 2022, Izawa announced her engagement to fellow mixed martial artist Kosuke "CORO" Terashima.

Mixed martial arts career 
Izawa began training mixed martial arts in June 2020 due to the COVID-19 pandemic preventing her from competing in judo.

Jewels (2020–present)

Early success 
Izawa made her professional debut against Mika Arai at Deep Jewels 30 on October 31, 2020. She won the fight by unanimous decision.

Izawa was scheduled to face the interim Jewels Strawweight champion Miki Motono in a non-title bout at Deep Jewels 32 on December 19, 2020. She won the fight by unanimous decision, with scores of 30-27, 30-27 and 29-28.

Strawweight Champion 
Izawa and Miki Motono fought a rematch for the interim Jewels Strawweight Championship at Deep Jewels 33 on June 19, 2021. She won the fight by a first-round submission, forcing Motono to tap with an armbar at the 3:32 minute mark. It was the first stoppage victory of her professional career. Izawa was promoted to undisputed champion on March 15, 2022, after Mizuki Inoue vacated the belt.

Izawa made her atomweight debut against Si Woo Park at DEEP 104 Impact on October 23, 2021. She won the fight by unanimous decision, with scores of 28-27, 29-26 and 29-26. Park was deducted two points in the second round for an illegal soccer kick. Following this victory, Fight Matrix recognized Izawa as the fifth best atomweight in the world.

Rizin FF (2021–present)

Super Atomweight Champion 
Izawa faced the reigning Rizin Super Atomweight champion Ayaka Hamasaki in a non-title match at Rizin 33 - Saitama on December 31, 2021. She won the fight by technical knockout, stopping Hamasaki with a mixture of grounded elbows and punches. It was the first knockout victory of her professional career. After beating Hamasaki, Izawa was ranked as the best atomweight in the world by both Fight Matrix and Sherdog.

Izawa challenged the reigning Rizin Super Atomweight champion Ayaka Hamasaki at Rizin 35 on April 16, 2022. She was once again able to utilize her superior grappling to win the fight by unanimous decision.

Super Atomweight Grand Prix 
At a press conference held by Rizin on July 7, 2022, it was announced that Izawa would participate in an eight-women grand prix, with a ¥7,000,000 prize for the eventual tournament winner. Izawa faced the undefeated Laura Fontoura in the tournament quarterfinals, which were held at Rizin 37 - Saitama on July 31, 2022. She won the fight by a first-round submission, forcing Fontoura to tap with a guillotine choke at the 3:47 minute mark of the opening round.

Izawa was expected to face Rena Kubota in the tournament semifinals, at Rizin 38 on September 25, 2022. Kubota was forced to withdraw from the bout however, as the orbital bone fracture which she sustained in her previous fight hadn't yet healed. Kubota was replaced by Anastasiya Svetkivska. Izawa won the fight by a second-round submission, as she forced her opponent to tap to an armbar with just four seconds left in the round.

Izawa rematched Si Woo Park in the final of the Rizin Super Atomweight Grand Prix on December 31, 2022 at Rizin 40 She won the Grand Prix and the bout in a close bout via split decision.

Continued title reign
Izawa faced the one-time Rizin Super Atomweight title challenger Miyuu Yamamoto in a non-title bout at Rizin 42 on May 6, 2023.

Championships and accomplishments

Grappling 
 2012 Junior Queen's Cup Tournament Runner-up (-52 kg)
 2012 Japanese National Junior High School Wrestling Tournament Winner (-57 kg)
 2014 National High School Judo Championship Third Place (-52 kg)
 2019 All Japan Women's Sumo Championship Ultra-Lightweight 2nd Place (< 50 kg)

Mixed martial arts 
 Jewels
 Jewels Strawweight Championship (One time; current)
 Super Atomweight Grand Prix (2022)
 Rizin FF
 Rizin FF Women's Super Atomweight Championship (One time; current)
 2022 Rizin Women's Super Atomweight Grand Prix Champion
 eFight
 April 2022 Fighter of the Month
 Fight Matrix
 2022 Female Fighter of the Year

Mixed martial arts record 

 
|-
|Win
|align=center| 9–0
|Si Woo Park
|Decision (split)
|Rizin 40
|
|align=center| 3
|align=center| 5:00
|Saitama, Japan
|
|-
|Win
|align=center|8–0
|Anastasiya Svetkivska
|Submission (armbar)
|Rizin 38
|
|align=center|2
|align=center|4:56
|Saitama, Japan
|
|-
|Win
|align=center|7–0
|Laura Fontoura
|Submission (guillotine choke)
|Rizin 37
|
|align=center|1
|align=center|3:47
|Saitama, Japan
|
|-
|Win
|align=center|6–0
|Ayaka Hamasaki
|Decision (unanimous)
|Rizin 35
|
|align=center|3
|align=center|5:00
|Chōfu, Japan
| 
|-
| Win
| align=center| 5–0
|Ayaka Hamasaki
|TKO (elbows and punches)
|Rizin 33
|
|align=center|2
|align=center|2:50
|Saitama, Japan
|
|-
| Win
| align=center| 4–0
| Si Woo Park
| Decision (unanimous)
| DEEP 104 Impact
| 
| align=center| 3
| align=center| 5:00
| Tokyo, Japan
| 
|-
| Win
| align=center| 3–0
| Miki Motono
| Submission (armbar)
| Deep Jewels 33
| 
| align=center| 1
| align=center| 3:32
| Tokyo, Japan
| 
|-
| Win
| align=center| 2–0
| Miki Motono
| Decision (unanimous)
| Deep Jewels 32
| 
| align=center| 3
| align=center| 5:00
| Tokyo, Japan
| 
|-
| Win
| align=center| 1–0
| Mika Arai
| Decision (unanimous)
| Deep Jewels 30
| 
| align=center| 3
| align=center| 5:00
| Tokyo, Japan
| 
|-

Jiu-jitsu record 

|-  style="background:#cfc;"
| 2021-09-04|| Win ||align=left| Mika Nagano || Deep Jewels 34 || Tokyo, Japan || Submission (heel hook) || 1 || 0:50
|-
|-  style="background:#cfc;"
| 2021-09-04|| Win ||align=left| Emi Tomimatsu || Deep Jewels 34 || Tokyo, Japan || Submission (armbar) || 1 || 3:51
|-
|-  style="background:#cfc;"
| 2021-03-07|| Win ||align=left| Megumi Sugimoto || Deep Jewels 32 || Tokyo, Japan || Submission (rear-naked choke) || 1 || 0:58
|-
|-  style="background:#cfc;"
| 2020-11-29|| Win ||align=left| Sakura Mori || DEEP & Pancrase Osaka || Osaka, Japan || Decision (Unanimous) ||  || 
|-
|-  style="background:#c5d2ea;"
| 2020-08-30 || Draw ||align=left| Yuki Sugiuchi || ZST Battle Hazard 07 || Tokyo, Japan || Decision (Time Limit) || 1 || 7:00
|-
| colspan=9 | Legend:

See also 
 List of female mixed martial artists
 List of current Rizin FF fighters
 List of undefeated mixed martial artists

References 

1997 births
Japanese female mixed martial artists
Living people
Atomweight mixed martial artists
Strawweight mixed martial artists
Mixed martial artists utilizing judo
Mixed martial artists utilizing wrestling
Mixed martial artists utilizing Sumo
Japanese female judoka
Japanese female sport wrestlers
Amateur wrestlers
Female sumo wrestlers